Cold Spell is an album by American keyboardist and composer Wayne Horvitz' band Zony Mash recorded in 1997 and released on the independent Knitting Factory label.

Reception
The Allmusic review by Solar Marquardt awarded the album 3 stars stating "The recording has a mellow quality, perhaps even slightly muted, but overall it works by giving the album a smooth tonality. With remarkable musicianship and themes you just can't forget, this debut album established Zony Mash as a modern jazz force to be reckoned with".

Track listing
All compositions by Wayne Horvitz except as indicated
 "With the Space on Top" - 2:53   
 "Happens Like That" - 5:19   
 "Sex Fiend" (John Zorn) - 3:38   
 "Prudence RSVP" - 7:07   
 "Cold Spell" - 4:37   
 "Mel" (Fred Chalenor) - 3:12   
 "Let's Get Mashed" - 4:06   
 "Smiles" - 5:06   
 "The Gift" - 3:14   
 "Withdrawal Symptoms" (Timothy Young) - 2:33   
 "Daylight" - 3:18  
Recorded at Flora Avenue Studios in 1997

Personnel
Wayne Horvitz - Hammond B-3 organ
Timothy Young - guitar
Fred Chalenor - electric bass
Andy Roth - drums

References

Knitting Factory Records albums
Wayne Horvitz albums
1997 albums